Westhide is a village and civil parish in Herefordshire, England,  north-east of Hereford.  The parish had a population of 79 in the 2001 UK Census and is grouped with Preston Wynne and Withington to form Withington Group Parish Council for administrative purposes. The village lies on hilly farmland and to the south is Shucknall Hill.

The parish church is dedicated to St Bartholomew and has a large but short 12th-century tower.  In the churchyard are the remains of a medieval preaching cross now topped by an 18th-century sundial. It went through a major restoration during the nineteenth century by architect Thomas Blashill, FRIBA, which included an addition of a south-facing porch.

The course of the Herefordshire and Gloucestershire Canal runs just north of the village.

See also 
 More information is to be found on the Group Parish's website

References

External links
 Westhide, GENUKI genealogy web portal
 List of monuments in the parish
 Most of the sites are on private property and are not open to the public

Villages in Herefordshire